This is a list of universities and colleges in New Brunswick, Canada:

Public chartered universities

Dalhousie Medicine New Brunswick
Mount Allison University
St. Thomas University
Université de Moncton
University of New Brunswick

Private chartered universities
Crandall University
Kingswood University
St. Stephen's University

Private universities recognized under the Degree Granting Act
University of Fredericton
Yorkville University

Colleges
 Canadian School of Natural Nutrition
 Collège communautaire du Nouveau-Brunswick
 Eastern College
 Maritime College of Forest Technology
 McKenzie College
 Moncton Flight College
 New Brunswick College of Craft and Design
 New Brunswick Community College
 OLS Academy
 Oulton College
 Union of New Brunswick Indians Training Institute, Inc. (UNBITI)
Atlantic Business College,Fredericton,NB

See also
Higher education in Canada
Higher education in New Brunswick
List of business schools in Canada
List of Canadian universities by endowment
List of colleges in Canada
List of law schools in Canada
List of universities in Canada

New Brunswick
Universities and colleges